Scholtzia is a genus of flowering plants in the family Myrtaceae,  which are endemic to the south-west of Western Australia. The genus was first described by Schauer in 1843, who named it in  honour of the physician Heinrich Scholtz. The type species is Scholtzia obovata.  

Species include:
Scholtzia capitata Benth.
Scholtzia ciliata F.Muell. 
Scholtzia drummondii Benth. 
Scholtzia eatoniana C.A.Gardner
Scholtzia involucrata (Endl.) Druce - Spiked scholtzia
Scholtzia laxiflora Benth.
Scholtzia leptantha Benth.
Scholtzia obovata (DC.) Schauer
Scholtzia oligandra Benth.  - Pink scholtzia
Scholtzia parviflora F.Muell.
Scholtzia spatulata (Turcz.) Benth. 
Scholtzia teretifolia Benth. 
Scholtzia uberiflora F.Muell.
Scholtzia umbellifera F.Muell.

See also

References

 
Rosids of Western Australia
Myrtaceae genera
Endemic flora of Southwest Australia